Charles Patrick Joseph Mooney (1865 – November 22, 1926) was an American newspaper publisher, becoming"one of the widest known newspapermen of the south".

Born at Bardstown Junction, Kentucky Mooney was "tireless, combative and a devoutly Catholic teetotaler". He was the managing editor of The Commercial Appeal in Memphis, Tennessee, from 1896 to 1902, and again from 1908 until his death in 1926. Mooney was also known for his temper, with one report stating:

References

External links
Digital Archives of the Memphis Public Library page on C.P.J. Mooney

1865 births
1926 deaths
People from Bullitt County, Kentucky
19th-century American newspaper publishers (people)
20th-century American newspaper publishers (people)